Lhota pod Hořičkami is a municipality and village in Náchod District in the Hradec Králové Region of the Czech Republic. It has about 300 inhabitants.

Administrative parts
Villages of Světlá and Újezdec are administrative parts of Lhota pod Hořičkami.

References

Villages in Náchod District